Sandved is a borough of the city of Sandnes in the west part of the large municipality of Sandnes in Rogaland county, Norway. The  borough has a population (2016) of 6,034.  The borough is located just south of the downtown part of the city.

The local sports team is Sandved IL, and Sandneshallen is located here.  The local church is Gand Church.

References

Boroughs and neighbourhoods of Sandnes